Femslash (also known as "f/f slash", "f/f", "femmeslash", "altfic" and "saffic") is a subgenre of slash fan fiction which focuses on romantic and/or sexual relationships between female fictional characters.

Characteristics 
Typically, characters featured in femslash are heterosexual in the canon universe; however, similar fan fiction about lesbian or bisexual female characters is commonly labeled as femslash for convenience. The term is generally applied only to fanworks based on Western fandoms; the nearest anime/manga equivalents are more often called yuri and shōjo-ai fanfiction. "Saffic" is a portmanteau of Sapphic from the term Sapphic love and fiction. "Altfic" as a term for fanfiction about loving relationships between women was popularized by Xena fans.

There is less femslash than there is slash based on male couples; for example, in The Lord of the Rings fandom, only a small number of femslash stories are written about the Arwen/Éowyn pairing in comparison to slash between the male characters. It has been suggested that heterosexual female slash authors generally do not write femslash, and that it is rare to find a fandom with two sufficiently engaging female characters.  Janeway/Seven is the main Star Trek femslash pairing, as only they have "an on-screen relationship fraught with deep emotional connection and conflict".  Although it is debated whether fanfiction about canon lesbians such as Willow and Tara of Buffy the Vampire Slayer counts as "slash", their relationship storylines are more coy than heterosexual ones, which entices Willow/Tara femslash authors to fill in the gaps in the known relationship storyline. It is "relatively recently" that male writers have begun writing femslash, and this entry of males into femslash has occurred within Buffy femslash. The femslash authorship is mostly female. As of 2006, femslash is enjoying increasing popularity and is the "dominant form" of slash in some fandoms.

History 
Femslash was relatively rare in fanfiction communities until the 1990s. The show Xena: Warrior Princess served as one of the first major femslash fandoms, with the relationship Xena/Gabrielle, and also served as one of the first major fandoms where alternative universe fics were widely written.

The television show The L Word set up a contest at the website FanLib.com where fans could submit a femme slash fanfic. The winner's story was incorporated into a scene of a third-season episode.

In more recent TV series, such as Rizzoli and Isles, Warehouse 13, Orange Is the New Black, Supergirl and Once Upon a Time, the slash-shipping portions of the fandoms are significant, particularly in online forums.

See also

 Fan fiction
 Lesbian literature
 Lesbian science fiction
 Lesbianism in erotica
 Slash fiction
 Xena: Warrior Princess in popular culture
 Yaoi
 Yuri (genre)

Reference

Slash fiction
Fan fiction
Lesbian fiction
Sexuality in fiction